Carmen Rasmusen Herbert (born March 25, 1985) is a Canadian-American country music artist who ranked sixth on the second season of American Idol in 2003. Rasmusen also plays piano and guitar.

Early life
Rasmusen was born on March 25, 1985 in Edmonton and is of Norwegian heritage.  She is a member of the Church of Jesus Christ of Latter-day Saints. The second of four children, Rasmusen has been performing in public since the age of five: singing, dancing (including cheerleading, tap, ballet and hip-hop dance), and playing the piano.

She graduated from Woods Cross High School in Northern Utah in 2003, and is an alumna of Brigham Young University.

American Idol
Rasmusen auditioned initially in Los Angeles and was put through to Hollywood.  She was originally eliminated by the judges during the Top 100 stage.  In a surprise move, Rasmusen and three other young female singers were brought back to compete in the Wild Card show.  No clear reason was made public, but speculation at the time centered on the show's producers wanting to provide a greater demographic diversity in the Final 12.

Rasmusen performed "Can't Fight the Moonlight" by LeAnn Rimes for her Wild Card performance.  Although the judges, including Simon Cowell, opined that it was not a good enough performance to advance, the next night Cowell chose her as his "judge's choice" to move into the Top 12.  Carmen survived for seven weeks in the finals, earning generally mixed reviews from the judges throughout her stay.  Her performances of "You Can't Hurry Love" and "Turn the Beat Around" received relatively high marks from both judges and viewers, while her rendition of Blondie's "Call Me" during Billboard Number One Hits Night drew brickbats.  Judge Randy Jackson was often one of her harshest critics.

Rasmusen was praised by her fans as having a wholesome, girlish appeal and for refusing to wear outfits she thought were inappropriate for her.  Fans also cited her on-stage energy and strong vocal projection.  Detractors pointed to her recurring difficulty in controlling her natural vibrato and her tendency to yodel when changing registers. She was also one of the most outspoken defenders of the show among the second season finalists in the wake of the scandal involving Corey Clark's allegations regarding Paula Abdul.

As the only contestant in the second season under the age of eighteen, she had to spend three hours a day with an on-set tutor. Her mother had to accompany her with the other contestants to the special American Idol house, where they all lived during the competition. She also became close friends with season 2 runner-up Clay Aiken.

After her elimination, she went on to appear in numerous shows promoting American Idol and she appeared on the last episode of the second season singing with the other finalists. Rasmusen also appeared on the American Idol Season 2: All-Time Classic American Love Songs singing "How Do I Live" by LeAnn Rimes.

In June 2008, Rasmusen starred as one of the headliners for a live music show in Branson, MO, called America's Favorite Finalists. The show featured six top 12 American Idol Finalists performing their own music, cover songs and group numbers. The show ran at the Grand Palace.

Performances
Wildcards - "Can't Fight the Moonlight" by LeAnn Rimes
Top 12 (Motown) - "You Can't Hurry Love" by The Supremes
Top 11 (Movies) - "Hopelessly Devoted to You" by Olivia Newton-John
Top 10 (Country Rock) - "Wild Angels" by Martina McBride
Top 8 (Disco) - "Turn the Beat Around" by Vicki Sue Robinson (Bottom 2)
Top 8 (Billboard Number One Hits) - "Call Me" by Blondie
Top 7 (Billy Joel's Music) - "And So It Goes" (Bottom 2)
Top 6 (Diane Warren's Music) - "Love Will Lead You Back" by Taylor Dayne (Eliminated)
 Due to Corey Clark's disqualification, the Top 9 performances became Top 8 when no one was eliminated.

Music career

Carmen
Her first EP, Carmen, was self-released and included her first single, Photograph.

Nothin' Like the Summer
Rasmusen is signed with Lofton Creek Records. Her debut album, Nothin' Like the Summer was released on August 28, 2007, and the first single, "Nothin' Like the Summer", debuted in the United States on April 24, 2007 and also debuted in Shanghai, Australia and United Kingdom. The song was written by Rasmusen, Victoria Shaw and Jason Deere, who also produced both the song and her album.

Rasmusen did a radio tour in support of the album; she participated in shows at 30 radio stations and 10 television shows including Fox, MSNBC, Today, and Geraldo. She also opened concerts for Tracy Byrd and Jason Michael Carroll.

As part of her tour, she started a new program called "Hitching a Ride" where fans can hitch a ride and hang on her tour bus.

Acting career
Rasmusen made her acting debut in 2003 in the feature film Pride and Prejudice: A Latter-Day Comedy as Charlotte Lucas.  In 2004, Carmen released an EP by R3 Records, Carmen.

Rasmusen also appeared in a three episode series of NBC's Fear Factor, aired on June 13, 2006 - June 27, 2006.  In the first episode, she was teamed with Anthony Fedorov, and won the first challenge involving a demolition derby, ultimately winning a trip to Africa. She finished in second place.

In June 2006, Carmen played a news reporter in commercials for Maverik, a convenience store in the western USA.

Other projects
In the fall of 2007, Carmen's first book was released.  Staying in Tune discusses how she's been able to uphold her values while involved with the entertainment industry.

Personal life
On December 15, 2005, Carmen married Bradley Herbert, the son of former Utah Governor Gary R. Herbert in Bountiful, Utah. In December 2008, she gave birth to a son named Boston. Her second son, Beckham, was born on October 26, 2010.

Carmen currently writes an entertainment column for the Deseret News.

Discography

Studio albums

Singles

Music videos

Filmography 
Pride & Prejudice: A Latter-Day Comedy (2003), as Charlotte Lucas
Down and Derby (2005), as Marilyn

Awards and nominations

References

External links
Lofton Creek Records

1985 births
Living people
Canadian people of Norwegian descent
Canadian Latter Day Saints
Canadian emigrants to the United States
Brigham Young University alumni
Deseret News people
Actresses from Edmonton
American Idol participants
Canadian television actresses
Canadian child singers
Canadian country singer-songwriters
Musicians from Edmonton
Lofton Creek Records artists
21st-century Canadian actresses
American columnists
American women columnists
21st-century Canadian women singers
21st-century American women